Archimède le clochard is a 1959 French drama film directed by Gilles Grangier. It is also known as The Magnificent Tramp. The film was entered into the 9th Berlin International Film Festival, where Jean Gabin won the Silver Bear for Best Actor.

Plot
A sophisticated tramp lives during summer in a half-finished construction site. Because he doesn't want to be cold in the winter, he decides to get imprisoned on time. Therefore, he demolishes a bar but he is only incarcerated for a single week. He promises he will find a way to come back.

Cast
 Jean Gabin as Joseph Hugues Guillaume Boutier-Blainville aka Archimède
 Paul Frankeur as Monsieur Grégoire, the first inn keeper
 Darry Cowl as Arsène, the second inn keeper
 Bernard Blier as Monsieur Pichon, the new inn keeper
 Dora Doll as Madame Pichon
 Gaby Basset as Mme Grégoire
 Sacha Briquet as Jean-Loup, the English guest
 Guy Decomble as the RATP station manager
 Albert Dinan as the caterer
 Noël Roquevert as Capitaine Brossard, the retired commander
 Julien Carette as Félix, le clochard aux chiens
 Paul Frankeur as M. Grégoire, l'ancien patron
 Jacqueline Maillan as Madame Marjorie

References

External links

1959 films
1950s French-language films
1959 drama films
French black-and-white films
Films directed by Gilles Grangier
Films with screenplays by Michel Audiard
French drama films
1950s French films